Ingomar is an unincorporated community in Merced County, California.

A post office operated at Ingomar from 1890 to 1921. The name was probably from the 1842 German play Ingomar, the Barbarian by Baron Eligius Franz Joseph von Münch-Bellinghausen, a popular work in the dramatic canon in the late 19th century.

References

Unincorporated communities in California
Unincorporated communities in Merced County, California